is a platform game for the Mega Drive/Genesis, based on the Hanna-Barbera animated television series The Flintstones. The game was published in 1993 by Taito in North America and Japan while Sega distributed the game in Europe.

Gameplay
The Flintstones is a platform game with 24 levels. The player controls Fred Flintstone, who must complete seven tasks, which include locating his daughter Pebbles, and a necklace belonging to his wife Wilma. The player is capable of jumping, and uses a club as a weapon against various enemies throughout the game.

Reception

The Flintstones received mixed reviews. Back in 1993, reviewers were more forgiving, with magazines like Sega Force awarding it a 7.2/10, and Mega Fun a 6.5/10. More recently, gamers have been more critical; Jeuxvideo.com awarded the game a 13/20 (6.5/10) while Sega-16.com gave the game a 5/10. Power Unlimited gave the game a review score of 80% writing: "The Flintstones is one of the more fun games of its kind. The animations may be bad, but they are funny. As befits a good platformer, the levels are varied, and Fred Flintstone can do a lot of different moves."

References

External links

1993 video games
Platform games
Sega Genesis games
Sega Genesis-only games
Sega video games
Side-scrolling platform games
Single-player video games
Taito games
Video games based on The Flintstones
Video games developed in Japan
Warner Bros. video games